Ipče Ahmedovski (Macedonian and Serbian Cyrillic: Ипче Ахмедовски; 6 January 1966 – 30 July 1994) was a popular Serbian and Macedonian folk singer.

A younger brother of the 1980s folk singer Jašar Ahmedovski, Ipče frequently sung in his father's kafana before he eventually moved to Belgrade to launch his professional singing career. He recorded his first album Bila si devojčica godina mojih in 1986 with the orchestra of composers Rade Vučković and Tomica Miljić. Later, he recorded several albums with another Serbian composer Novica Urošević and in the early nineties achieved popularity in Serbia.

Ahmedovski died in a car crash in 1994 on Ibarska magistrala near Šopići, crashing his speeding Mercedes into a truck.

Selected discography
Bila si devojčica godina mojih (1986)
Činio sam čuda (1990)
Luda devojka (1991)
Ciganske duše (1993)

References

1966 births
1994 deaths
Macedonian folk singers
Serbian folk singers
20th-century Serbian male singers
Yugoslav male singers
Road incident deaths in Yugoslavia
Road incident deaths in Serbia
People from Prilep Municipality
Serbian turbo-folk singers
Macedonian folk-pop singers